Aguas Dulces is a resort in the Rocha Department of southeastern Uruguay.

Geography
Its nominal distance from Montevideo is 288 km, using Ruta Interbalnearia, Route 9 and Route 16 (via Castillos).

Population
In 2011 Aguas Dulces had a population of 417 permanent inhabitants and 1,596 dwellings.
 
Source: Instituto Nacional de Estadística de Uruguay

References

External links
INE map of Aguas Dulces
Tourist information for Aguas Dulces

Populated places in the Rocha Department
Seaside resorts in Uruguay